Zosimus, Zosimos, Zosima or Zosimas  may refer to:

People

 Rufus and Zosimus (died 107), Christian saints
 Zosimus (martyr) (died 110), Christian martyr who was executed in Umbria, Italy
 Zosimos of Panopolis, also known as Zosimus Alchemista, 3rd-century alchemist
 Zosimus the Hermit, 3rd-century Christian ascetic
 Zosimus, bishop of Naples,  – 
 Zosimas of Palestine ( – ), Eastern Orthodox saint
 Zosimas of Solovki (died 1478), Russian Orthodox saint, founder of Solovetsky Monastery
 Pope Zosimus (died 418), born in Mesoraca, Calabria, who reigned from 417 to his death in 418
 Zosimus (historian), 5th-century Byzantine historian
 Zosimos of Samosata, mosaicist at Zeugma
 Zosimus, 5th-century hermit who discovered Mary of Egypt in the desert
 Zosimus the Epigrammist in Anthologia Graeca
 John Zosimus (Ioane-Zosime), 10th-century Georgian monk and hymnist
 Zosimus, Metropolitan of Moscow (died 1494), Metropolitan of Moscow and Russia from 1490, author of the Third Rome conception

 Zosimo Paredes (born 1948), Filipino politician

 Zosima, character in the novel The Brothers Karamazov by Fyodor Dostoyevsky

Biology
Zosimus (crab), a genus of crabs in the family Xanthidae
Zosima (plant), a genus of plants in the family Apiaceae

See also
Story of Zosimus, Old Testament apocrypha
Zozimus, Irish street rhymer